Thomas James Chilton (born 15 March 1985) is a British racing driver. He has spent most of his career competing in touring car racing; he was a former factory Vauxhall and Honda driver in the British Touring Car Championship, and currently drives for Ciceley Motorsport in the British Touring Car Championship. His younger brother, Max Chilton, is also a racing driver.

Career

Early life
Chilton was born in Reigate. His father, Grahame Chilton, is a businessman who co-owned the insurance company Benfield Group up until 2008, when it was taken over by Aon plc for £738m. Chilton became vice-chairman of Aon after the deal and also collected around £77m for his stake. Chilton was educated at Reigate St Mary's School and Shiplake College. A keen racer from an early age, he competed in the BRSCC T Cars Championship in 1999 and 2000, going on to take the BRSCC Saloon Car winter championship in 2001. His brother, Max Chilton, is also a racing driver.

British Touring Car Championship

Barwell Motorsport (2002)

Turning his attention to the BTCC, he was teammate to ex-Superbike racer Aaron Slight in 2002 driving a Vauxhall Astra Coupé for Barwell Motorsport. He proved to be very quick, and although his lack of experience counted against him he nevertheless finished the season in 15th place overall and 5th in the Independents' Cup.

Arena Motorsport (2003–2005)
In 2003 he finished in 9th place overall driving a works Honda Civic Type-R run by Arena Motorsport alongside Matt Neal and Alan Morrison. With Honda withdrawing manufacturer support for 2004, Arena only had the budget to run a single car for Chilton. However, the car was still well-prepared and he came through to take his first victory during the 9th race of the season, at Silverstone, in the process becoming the youngest winner of a BTCC race. He won again in the 29th race at Donington.

His plans for 2005 centred around the DTM with a new programme backed by MG Rover, but this fell through with the demise of the British marque. He and Arena rejoined the BTCC at the second meeting of the season and combined his touring car duties with racing for Zytek in the ALMS and LMS endurance series. Chilton won in both ALMS and LMS racing. He was classified 5th in the 2005 British Touring Car Championship despite only starting 24 of the 30 races. Chilton's involvement with Zytek continued, subject to funding and availability; Tom and his brother Max drove the car at the Silverstone 1000 km in September 2007.

VX Racing (2006–2007)

VX Racing signed him for 2006 to drive the No. 5 Vauxhall Astra Sport Hatch. In a disappointing season for Vauxhall, Chilton never won a race and slipped to 7th overall. However, Vauxhall retained Chilton and Fabrizio Giovanardi for 2007, however the team built the car around Giovanardi. Chilton finished 9th overall. Chilton decided he did not want to stay at VX Racing in 2008.

Team Halfords (2008)
He left to partner Gordon Shedden at Team Dynamics for the 2008 BTCC season and replacing VX Racing-bound Matt Neal. In the final round of the championship, Chilton won his first race since round 25 of the 2005 season with a dominant victory at Brands Hatch. This also ensured his 10th place in the championship.

Team Aon (2009–2011)
For 2009 Chilton returned to Arena Motorsport to drive a Ford Focus ST in the BTCC under the Team Aon banner, but spent much of the year developing the car and he ended the season 13th in the drivers' standings.

He remained with the team for 2010. The LPG-powered car was more competitive, taking four of the first five poles, but bad luck meant teammate Tom Onslow-Cole took better results than Chilton initially. Both were on the podium in race two at Snetterton. At Silverstone the team was dominant, and Chilton was allowed to take both wins ahead of teammate Tom Onslow-Cole. Onslow-Cole finished ahead in the overall drivers' championship but Chilton secured the Independents' Trophy by a two-point margin over Steven Kane.

For 2011 the team developed a new car based on the new third generation Ford Focus which ran to Super 2000 regulations powered by an NGTC turbocharged engine. Results were poor initially as the car was developed but Chilton took the car to pole position at Knockhill, going on to win race one. He also won the final race of the season at Silverstone. He finished the year 7th in the drivers' championship on 197 points.

Power Maxed Racing (2017)

After five seasons absent, Chilton returned to the BTCC in 2017, driving a factory-supported Power Maxed Racing Vauxhall Astra. He took a third-place finish in the third race at the opening round at Brands Hatch, after starting from pole.

Team Shredded Wheat Racing with Gallagher (2018-19)
On 20 December 2017, Chilton decided to focus on his BTCC career. Signing into the team who have won the 2016 Independents title, Motorbase Performance under the name of Team Shredded Wheat Racing with Gallagher due to its sponsorship. Chilton took his first win after 2011, winning at Knockhill after started from pole in 3rd race.

BTC Racing (2020) 
On 10 January 2020, it was announced that Chilton would join the BTC Racing team for the upcoming season as part of an expanded three-car team. Chilton took a best finish of 2nd at Thruxon and finished 10th in the Driver's Championship and 4th in the Independent Driver's Championship.

Ciceley Motorsport (2021) 
On 12 January 2021, Ciceley Motorsport announced that Chilton would be joining the team for the 2021 Season.

World Touring Car Championship

Team Aon (2012)

Chilton made his debut in the World Touring Car Championship in 2012, driving for the Arena Motorsport team with their Ford Focus S2000 TC alongside fellow WTCC debutant James Nash. Although he was new to the championship, Chilton was ruled out of the Yokohama Trophy due to his experience in the BTCC as both a privateer and a works driver. In race one in Morocco, he scored the first points for Ford in their WTCC return after coming home in seventh place. He scored another point in race two in Slovakia. Chilton was given a five place grid penalty for a collision during qualifying for the Race of Austria, he locked up down the inside of Franz Engstler and made contact, putting Engstler out of Q1. An engine change for both Fords at the Race of Japan sent Chilton to the back of the grid for the first race. In the final race at Macau, Chilton lost control in the oil left on the track from Alex MacDowall's collision with the barrier on lap 4, the subsequent crash forced him to retire. Chilton finished 19th in the drivers' standings, two places behind teammate Nash. After the season, the Arena Motorsport suspended their WTCC programme after losing technical backing from Ford and closed down, leaving Chilton without a drive for 2013.

RML (2013)
Chilton moved to RML for the 2013 season, driving a Chevrolet Cruze 1.6T alongside former world champion Yvan Muller. He finished second behind Muller at the season opening Race of Italy He took his first WTCC pole position at the Race of the United States, beating teammate Muller. From pole he held off Tiago Monteiro to claim his first race win in the World Touring Car Championship.  During the final race of the season, the 2013 Guia Race of Macau, Chilton dropped out with exhaust problems but not before being involved in the accident that caused the second red flag of race 2, as Eurico de Jesus hit him and under the subsequent safety car multiple drivers barreled into each other at the scene to cause the red flag.

ROAL Motorsport (2014–2015)
On 12 December 2013 Chilton announced that in 2014 he would drive Car nr. 3. for the Italian-based team ROAL Motorsport in an all-new Chevrolet Cruze to be built by RML under the new TC1 regulations. His teammate in the season will be Dutch driver Tom Coronel. Chilton managed to take pole, fastest lap and victory in the first race at Beijing becoming the only non-Citroen driver to win the first race of any race weekend in 2014. A second-place finish followed in Japan and Chilton ended the season in 8th place. He continued with ROAL Motorsport in 2015.

Sébastien Loeb Racing (2016 - 2017) 
In 2016 Chilton raced in a Citroën for Sébastien Loeb Racing, together with Moroccan driver Mehdi Bennani. Chilton won the race in Argentina. He took 6 podiums in that season. In independents, Chilton managed to finish 2nd in the standings after losing to Mehdi Bennani, who secured his independents title in Shanghai due to advantage for his DNF after contact with Gabriele Tarquini in Race 1.

Chilton continued as a Sébastien Loeb Racing driver in the 2017 WTCC season. He took 3 wins in that season at Monza, Motegi, and Losail. When he won at Losail, Chilton also claimed his independent's title in 20th and final race of the season. When he won the independent's title, in overall standings, Chilton finished 3rd behind two championship contenders, Norbert Michelisz and that season's champion, Thed Björk. Also, it was the last race under "World Championship" name before changed into World Touring Car Cup.

TV appearances
He has appeared in five series of Top Gear. In Series 5, Episode 5, he was one of the drivers in the People Carrier Race. He then again appeared in the first episode of series 6 as one of the drivers in the Toyota Aygo football match. More recently he has appeared in Series 10 episode 6 when he raced a Chevrolet motorhome with other touring car drivers as well as Richard Hammond. In Series 12 episode 5 he raced (and then rolled over) a Leyland Olympian, and had earlier on in the episode raced against Jeremy Clarkson whilst driving a BMW M3. On 6 December 2009, he appeared in a further episode of Top Gear, racing against other touring car drivers in airport vehicles. In Series 20, episode 2, he raced a taxi cab against Richard Hammond.

In 2009 he appeared with Anthony Reid in a music video for singer-songwriter Andy J Gallagher.

Chilton appeared as a single man in Episode 4 of the first series of the ITV show Take Me Out hosted by Paddy McGuinness.

Racing record

Complete British Touring Car Championship results
(key) Races in bold indicate pole position (1 point awarded – 2002 all races, 2003–present just in first race) Races in italics indicate fastest lap (1 point awarded all races) * signifies that driver lead race for at least one lap (1 point given – 2002 just in feature race, 2003–present all races)

Complete World Touring Car Championship results
(key) (Races in bold indicate pole position) (Races in italics indicate fastest lap)

† Did not finish the race, but was classified as he completed over 90% of the race distance.
‡ Half points awarded as less than 75% of race distance was completed.

References

External links
 
btcc:action profile
Profile from btccinfo.co.uk

1985 births
Living people
People from Reigate
People educated at Reigate St Mary's School
People educated at Shiplake College
English racing drivers
British Touring Car Championship drivers
American Le Mans Series drivers
European Le Mans Series drivers
World Touring Car Championship drivers
Sébastien Loeb Racing drivers
Arena Motorsport drivers
Nürburgring 24 Hours drivers
Hyundai Motorsport drivers